Loose is a 1972 album by the rock band Crazy Horse, the follow-up to their self-titled debut. It marked the departure of founding guitarist Danny Whitten, as well as Jack Nitzsche and Nils Lofgren. In their place for this album were George Whitsell and Greg Leroy on guitars, and John Blanton on organ.

Track listing 
"Hit and Run" (Blanton) - 2:42
"Try" (Whitsell) - 3:18
"One Thing I Love" (Leroy) - 2:37
"Move" (Whitsell) - 3:14
"All Alone Now" (Whitsell) - 2:47
"All the Little Things" (Leroy) - 5:01
"Fair Weather Friend" (Leroy) - 2:42
"You Won't Miss Me" (Whitsell) - 2:47
"Going Home" (Leroy) - 2:50
"I Don't Believe It" (Whitsell) - 3:07
"Kind of Woman" (Blanton) - 4:25
"One Sided Love" (Whitsell) - 3:12
"And She Won't Even Blow Smoke in My Direction" (Whitsell) - 1:21

Personnel
Crazy Horse
 George Whitsell - electric and acoustic guitars, lead and backing vocals, congas
 Greg Leroy - electric, acoustic and slide guitars, lead and backing vocals
 John Blanton - organ, lead and backing vocals, piano, harmonica, cello
 Billy Talbot - bass, backing vocals
 Ralph Molina - drums, backing vocals, acoustic guitar
Additional personnel
 Joel Tepp - harmonica (13)

Production
 Fred Catero - producer/engineer
Crazy Horse - producer

References

1972 albums
Crazy Horse (band) albums
Reprise Records albums